Mount Maria is a mountain of the Hornby Mountains, adjacent to Port Howard, on West Falkland island (Falkland Islands).

As one of the highest mountains of the Falklands, it experienced some glaciation. The handful of mountains over  have:

pronounced corries with small glacial lakes at their bases, [and] morainic ridges deposited below the corries suggest that the glaciers and ice domes were confined to areas of maximum elevation with other parts of the islands experiencing a periglacial climate.

References

Maria